For Keeps may refer to:

For Keeps (album), an album by The Field Mice
For Keeps (film), a 1988 film starring Randall Batinkoff and Molly Ringwald
For Keeps, a bookstore in Atlanta, Georgia
For Keeps, a 1944 Broadway play by F. Hugh Herbert
For Keeps, a 1994 book by film critic Pauline Kael
 For Keeps, a song by Quavo
 For Keeps, a song by Gossip